Kaspars Ikstens (born 5 June 1988) is a Latvian international footballer who plays for Rīgas Futbola Skola, as a goalkeeper.

Career
Born in Riga, Ikstens has played for JFK Olimps, Skonto, FC Daugava, Víkingur, Jelgava and Rīgas Futbola Skola.

He made his international debut for Latvia in 2018.

References

1988 births
Living people
Latvian footballers
Latvia international footballers
JFK Olimps players
Skonto FC players
FC Daugava players
Ungmennafélagið Víkingur players
FK Jelgava players
FK RFS players
Latvian Higher League players
Úrvalsdeild karla (football) players
Association football goalkeepers
Latvian expatriate footballers
Latvian expatriate sportspeople in Iceland
Expatriate footballers in Iceland